This article provides a summary of results for elections to the New South Wales Legislative Assembly, the lower house in New South Wales's bicameral state legislative body, the Parliament of New South Wales, which came into being in 1856 when New South Wales achieved responsible government. New South Wales politics were initially non-partisan, with individual Members of Parliament choosing to align either with the Government or the Opposition. This changed at the 1887 election where, for the first time, candidates were members of official political parties. The first two major parties to form were the Free Trade Party and the Protectionist Party. The 1887 election saw the 79 members of the Free Trade Party elected form the government with the 37 elected Protectionist Party members form the opposition. The next election saw the Free Trade Party retain government but with a reduced majority. The 1891 saw the Labor Party for the first time. These three parties then fought out the next two elections through to 1898. After Federation in 1901, the Free Trade Party changed their name to the Liberal Reform Party with the Protectionists becoming the Progressive Party.

The 1904 election saw a massive defeat of the Progressive government and for the first time Labor became the major opposition party. Most of the Progressive members stood as the Liberals at the next election and the party folded not long after that. Labor won an outright majority for the first time at the 1910 election and increased it further in 1913. The Liberal Reform Party became the Nationalist Party of Australia in 1917 and Labor's main opposition through to 1932 when the conservatives became the United Australia Party and then the Liberal Party in 1945.

General election dates 
1901 New South Wales state election, held 3 July 1901
1904 New South Wales state election, held 6 August 1904
1907 New South Wales state election, held 10 September 1907
1910 New South Wales state election, held 14 October 1910
1913 New South Wales state election, held 6 December 1913
1917 New South Wales state election, held 24 March 1917
1920 New South Wales state election, held 20 March 1920
1922 New South Wales state election, held 25 February 1922
1925 New South Wales state election, held 30 May 1925
1927 New South Wales state election, held 8 October 1927
1930 New South Wales state election, held 25 October 1930
1932 New South Wales state election, held 11 June 1932
1935 New South Wales state election, held 11 May 1935
1938 New South Wales state election, held 26 March 1938
1941 New South Wales state election, held 10 May 1941
1944 New South Wales state election, held 27 May 1944
1947 New South Wales state election, held 3 May 1947
1950 New South Wales state election, held 17 June 1950
1953 New South Wales state election, held 14 February 1953
1956 New South Wales state election, held 3 March 1956
1959 New South Wales state election, held 21 March 1959
1962 New South Wales state election, held 3 March 1962
1965 New South Wales state election, held 1 May 1965
1968 New South Wales state election, held 24 February 1968
1971 New South Wales state election, held 13 February 1971
1973 New South Wales state election, held 17 November 1973
1976 New South Wales state election, held 1 May 1976
1978 New South Wales state election, held 7 October 1978
1981 New South Wales state election, held 19 September 1981
1984 New South Wales state election, held 24 March 1984
1988 New South Wales state election, held 19 March 1988
1991 New South Wales state election, held 25 May 1991
1995 New South Wales state election, held 25 March 1995
1999 New South Wales state election, held 27 March 1999
2003 New South Wales state election, held 22 March 2003
2007 New South Wales state election, held 24 March 2007
2011 New South Wales state election, held 26 March 2011
2015 New South Wales state election, held 28 March 2015
2019 New South Wales state election, held 23 March 2019
2023 New South Wales state election, 25 March 2023
2026 New South Wales state election, nn March 2026

By-election dates

Summary of results
The table below shows the total number of seats won by the major political parties at each election. The totals of the winning party or coalition are shown in bold, while other parties in government are shown in bold italic. Full details on any election are linked via the year of the election at the start of the row.

Notes
  At the 1913 election they dropped "and Reform" from their name and were known as simply as the Liberal Party. 
  At the 1898 election they were known as the National Federal Party. 
  Includes results for the Farmers and Settlers Association and the Country Party Association at the 1913 election as well for the second Progressive Party at the 1920, 1922 and 1925 elections. First contested as the Country Party at the 1927 election. At the 1981 election they were known as the National Country Party. From 1984 election onwards they been contesting as the National Party.

See also
Timeline of Australian elections

Elections
New South Wales, legislative elections
New South Wales